The 2021 Giro d'Italia Donne (commonly known as the Giro Rosa) was the 32nd edition of the Giro d'Italia Femminile women's road cycling stage race.

After the COVID-19 pandemic pushed the 2020 edition back to September, the 2021 edition saw the Giro Rosa return to its usual July timeslot. Despite that, the UCI demoted the race from the UCI Women's World Tour after the 2020 season, with the move being attributed to race organizers failing to provide the minimum of 45 minutes of live television coverage required for all top-tier Women's WorldTour races. As a result, this edition will be the race's first as a UCI Women's ProSeries event. However, with the race under new management, race organizers sought to adhere to the UCI's requirements and return the race to the UCI Women's World Tour in 2022.

Teams 
All nine UCI Women's WorldTeams, along with fifteen UCI Women's Continental Teams, participated in the race. Each team began the race with a squad of six riders, for a total of 144 riders. Of these riders, 92 finished.

UCI Women's WorldTeams

 
 
 
 
 
 
 
 
 

UCI Women's Continental Teams

Route 
After the 2020 edition was reduced to nine stages, the 2021 edition saw the Giro Rosa return to its usual ten-stage length. On 5 May 2021, race organizers revealed the host start and finish locations of each stage, with stage lengths and routes released during a press conference on 4 June. On 2 July, the race kicked off from Fossano, Piedmont, with a team time trial, which featured as the opening stage for the fifth consecutive edition since its implementation in 2017. The race then continued through Piedmont and travelled east through Liguria, Lombardy, and Veneto before finishing in Cormons, Friuli Venezia Giulia, on 11 July.

Stages

Stage 1 
2 July 2021 — Fossano to Cuneo,  (TTT)

Stage 2 
3 July 2021 — Boves to Prato Nevoso,

Stage 3 
4 July 2021 — Casale Monferrato to Ovada,

Stage 4 
5 July 2021 — Formazza (Fondovalle) to Riale di Formazza Cascata del Toce,  (ITT)

Stage 5 
6 July 2021 — Milan to Carugate,

Stage 6 
7 July 2021 — Colico to Colico (Lake Como),

Stage 7 
8 July 2021 — Sporazocco di Gavardo to Puegnago del Garda,

Stage 8 
9 July 2021 — San Vendemiano to Mortegliano,

Stage 9 
10 July 2021 — Feletto Umberto to Monte Matajur,

Stage 10 
11 July 2021 — Capriva del Friuli to Cormons,

Classification leadership table 
In the 2021 Giro d'Italia Donne, five different jerseys were awarded.

The most important was the general classification (GC), which was calculated by adding each cyclist's finishing times on each stage. Time bonuses were awarded to the first three finishers on all stages with the exception of the time trials: the stage winner won a ten-second bonus, with six and four seconds for the second and third placed riders, respectively. Bonus seconds were also awarded to the first three riders at intermediate sprints; three seconds for the winner of the sprint, two seconds for the rider in second, and one second for the rider in third. The rider with the least accumulated time after each stage was the race leader, identified by the pink jersey. This classification was considered the most important of the race, and the winner of the classification was considered the winner of the race.

Additionally, there was a points classification, for which cyclists received points for finishing in the top 10 of each stage. For winning a stage, a rider earned 15 points, with 12 for second, 10 for third, 8 for fourth, 6 for fifth, with a point fewer per place down to a single point for 10th place. The rider with the most accumulated points after each stage was identified by the cyclamen jersey.

There was also a mountains classification, the leadership of which was marked by a green jersey. In the mountains classification, points were won by being one of the first five riders to reach the top of a climb. Each climb was categorised as either first, second, or third-category, with more points available for the higher-categorised climbs. Of the 18 categorised climbs in the race, a majority were third-category climbs; only two climbs were marked as first-category, with there only being one second-category climb.

The young rider and the Italian rider classifications were decided in the same way as the general classification. However, only riders born on or after 1 January 1998 were eligible to be ranked in the former, while only riders born in Italy were eligible to be ranked in the latter classification. The leader of the young rider classification wore a white jersey. The leader of the Italian rider classification was awarded a blue jersey, but this jersey was not worn during the race.

There was also a team classification, for which the times of the best three cyclists per team on each stage were added together; the leading team at the end of each stage and at the race was the team with the lowest total time. Riders of the team classification leaders wore red dossards on the following stage.

 For stage 2, per the race regulations, Ashleigh Moolman, the first-placed rider of the second-placed team, was assigned the cyclamen jersey of the leader of the points classification, and Mavi García, the first-placed rider of the third-placed team, was assigned the green jersey of the leader of the mountains classification. However, neither rider was deemed to be officially leading those respective classifications, as no points had been awarded on stage 1 for either classification.
 On stage 3, Ashleigh Moolman, who was second in the points classification, wore the cyclamen jersey, because first placed Anna van der Breggen wore the pink jersey as the leader of the general classification. Because van der Breggen and Moolman were also first and second, respectively, in the mountains classification, Demi Vollering, who was third in that classification, wore the green jersey.
 On stages 4 and 6, Marianne Vos, who was second in the points classification, wore the cyclamen jersey, because first placed Anna van der Breggen wore the pink jersey as the leader of the general classification. For the same reason, Demi Vollering wore the cyclamen jersey on stage 5.
 On stage 9, Emma Norsgaard Jørgensen, who was second in the points classification, wore the cyclamen jersey, because first placed Marianne Vos pulled out prior to the stage to focus on the Olympic Games. On stage 10, Norsgaard Jørgensen continued wearing the cyclamen jersey, because first placed Anna van der Breggen wore the pink jersey as the leader of the general classification.

Final classification standings

General classification

Points classification

Mountains classification

Young rider classification

Italian rider classification

Team classification

See also 
 2021 in women's road cycling

Notes

References

Sources

External links 
 

Giro d'Italia Femminile
2021
Giro d'Italia Femminile
Giro d'Italia Femminile